Simon Thompson (born August 1966) is a British business executive, and the chief executive (CEO) of Royal Mail since January 2021.

Thompson's appointment as CEO was announced on 11 January 2021. Thompson will receive a salary of £500,000, plus a pension of 13.6% of base pay (about £71,400 a year) and bonuses yet to be determined.

Thompson, a non-executive director of Royal Mail since November 2017, was managing director of the NHS test and trace programme and has been chief product officer at Ocado. He has also worked at Apple, HSBC, lastminute.com, Morrisons and Honda Europe.

References

Living people
Royal Mail people
Apple Inc. executives
HSBC people
Honda people
British chief executives
1966 births